Puducherry (formerly known as "Pondicherry") is a Union Territory of India. Governance and administration of the territory fall directly under federal authority.

Chief Commissioner (1954  1963)

After the de facto transfer of French settlements in India, on November 1, 1954, a Chief Commissioner, appointed by Government of India, replaced the last Commissioner of French India, Georges Escargueil. The first High Commissioner, Kewal Singh was appointed immediately after the Kizhoor referendum, on 21 October 1954, as per Foreign Jurisdiction Act, 1947. The Chief Commissioner had the powers of the former French commissioner, but was under the direct control of the Union Government.

The list of Chief Commissioners is given below.

Lieutenant Governors
The Lieutenant Governor of Puducherry resides at the Raj Nivas at the Nehru Park, the former palace of the Governor General of French India. The Central government is more directly involved in the financial well-being of the territory.

After de jure transfer in 1962, the State of Pondicherry is fully and legally integrated into Indian Union. After the formation of Union territory on July 1, 1963, the Lieutenant Governor has replaced High Commissioner in Pondicherry.

Only five Lt. Governors managed to serve more than four years. They are S.L. Silam, B.D.Jatti, B.T. Kulkarni, Rajani Rai and Kiran Bedi. Only S.L. Silam completed his 5-year term. Kiran Bedi is second longest serving Lt. Governor till date. The list of Lt. Governors of Puducherry is given below.

Notes

See also
 Puducherry
 Governors in India
 Puducherry Legislative Assembly
 List of chief ministers of Puducherry
 List of consuls general of India in the French India
 List of speakers of the Puducherry Legislative Assembly

References

State political office-holders in India
 
Puducherry-related lists
Puducherry